Larry David Floyd (born May 1, 1961) is a Canadian former professional ice hockey centre and coach. Floyd played for numerous professional teams during his career from 1982 until 1984, including twelve games with the New Jersey Devils of the National Hockey League (NHL). Floyd also played roller hockey for the San Diego Barracudas in the RHI.

Biography
Floyd was born in Peterborough, Ontario. As a youth, he played in the 1974 Quebec International Pee-Wee Hockey Tournament with a minor ice hockey team from Peterborough. He later played junior ice hockey with the Peterborough Petes from 1978 until 1982. Floyd was not drafted by the NHL, and he pursued a professional career independently. After a professional tryout with the Rochester Americans in 1982, Floyd signed as a free agent with the New Jersey Devils in October 1982 and made his NHL debut February 27, 1983. Floyd would play 75 games that season with the Wichita Wind and seven games with the Devils. The following season (1983–84), Floyd was a member of the Maine Mariners and played five games with the Devils. Floyd would remain in the organization until 1987.

In 1987–88, Floyd split the season between Innsbrucker EV of the Austrian League and the Utica Devils. In 1988–89, Floyd moved to the Cape Breton Oilers, an affiliate of the Edmonton Oilers, where he became an assistant coach as well as a player. Floyd moved to the Phoenix Roadrunners for the next season, then finally to the San Diego Gulls, where he played four seasons. During his last two seasons, Floyd also played roller hockey with the San Diego Barracudas.

In 1994, Floyd turned to coaching, becoming a full-time coach with the Detroit Falcons of the Colonial League. In 1995, Floyd became head coach of the Huntsville Channel Cats, coaching the team for three seasons, each year making the playoffs. Floyd picked up one more season of coaching in 1998–99 with the Flint Generals.

Playing career

Career statistics

Roller hockey
1993 and 1994: San Diego Barracudas (RHI)

Coach
1988–89: Cape Breton Oilers (AHL)1994–95: Detroit Falcons (CoHL)1995–96: Huntsville Channel Cats (SHL)1996–98: Huntsville Channel Cats (CHL)1998–99: Flint Generals (UHL)

References

External links

1961 births
Canadian ice hockey centres
Cape Breton Oilers players
Ice hockey people from Ontario
Innsbrucker EV players
Living people
Maine Mariners players
New Jersey Devils players
Peterborough Petes (ice hockey) players
Phoenix Roadrunners (IHL) players
Rochester Americans players
San Diego Barracudas players
San Diego Gulls (IHL) players
Sportspeople from Peterborough, Ontario
Undrafted National Hockey League players
Utica Devils players
Wichita Wind players
Canadian expatriate ice hockey players in Austria